Mostafa Asal  (born 9 May 2001 in Cairo) is an Egyptian professional squash player. In January 2023, he reached a ranking of number 1 in the world.

Mostafa Asal won the British Junior U17 Open 2018, the PSA10 2018 Mar del Plata Open, PSA10 2018 Regatas Resistencia Open, the 2021 Men's PSA World Tour Finals, and the 2021 U.S. Open Squash Men's Championship.

References

2001 births
Living people
Egyptian male squash players
21st-century Egyptian people